Eremophila pendulina is a flowering plant in the figwort family, Scrophulariaceae and is endemic to Western Australia. It is a tall, spindly, weeping shrub with narrow leaves and purple, mauve or white flowers in autumn and early spring.

Description
The branches are thin, weak, flexible and drooping, dull reddish-brown in colour but sticky, shiny and often white due to the presence of dried resin. The leaves are mostly arranged alternately but clustered near the ends of the branches.

The petal tube is white to lilac-coloured, often darker on the top, and cream to yellow inside with purple to violet spots. The outer surface of the petal tube and lobes is hairy but the inner surface of the lobes is glabrous and the inside of the tube is filled with woolly hairs. The 4 stamens are fully enclosed in the petal tube.

Taxonomy and naming 
The species was first formally described by Robert Chinnock in 2007 and the description was published in Eremophila and Allied Genera: A Monograph of the Plant Family Myoporaceae. The specific epithet (pendulina) is derived from the Latin word pendulus meaning "hanging", referring to the rather pendulous leaves of this species.

Distribution and habitat
Eremophila pendulina grows in loamy sand on rocky hills between Meekatharra and Cobra Station, west of Mount Augustus in the Gascoyne and Murchison biogeographic regions.

Conservation
This species is classified as "not threatened" by the Western Australian Government Department of Parks and Wildlife.

References

Eudicots of Western Australia
pendulina
Endemic flora of Western Australia
Plants described in 2007
Taxa named by Robert Chinnock